John Thomas Oscroft (24 March 1846 – 15 June 1885) was an English cricketer who played first-class cricket for Nottinghamshire between 1867 and 1874. He was the brother of William Oscroft, who later captained Nottinghamshire from 1881 to 1882.

Career
Oscroft was a batsman, who occasionally bowled roundarm fast. Oscroft made his first-class debut in 1867, as a replacement for the injured George Parr. It was a county match between Nottinghamshire and Middlesex, and Oscroft made scores of 0 and 3. In 1868, Oscroft made an appearance for Beeston Cricket Club against Wirksworth Cricket Club. Oscroft score 0 opening the batting, ad took two wickets. The following year, Oscroft represented the All England Eleven along with his brother William; the match against a United All England Eleven was in benefit of George Anderson, and was heavily rain-affected. Oscroft did not bat or bowl, although he took a catch to dismiss George Summers. Oscroft also played professional cricket for Wellington College, and in 1872, Oscroft umpired a one-day match between Accrington and Burnley. He also played club cricket in Lancashire and Yorkshire.

Personal life
Oscroft was born on 24 March 1846, in Arnold, Nottinghamshire, England. He was the brother of William Oscroft, who later captained Nottingamshire. Aside from cricket, he owned a pub in Arnold. He died on 15 June 1885 of liver cirrhosis.

References

External links

English cricketers
Nottinghamshire cricketers
1846 births
1885 deaths
People from Arnold, Nottinghamshire
Cricketers from Nottinghamshire
United All-England Eleven cricketers
All-England Eleven cricketers
R. Daft's XI cricketers